Big Ask may refer to:

 the Big Ask, a 2006 British environmentalist campaign
 Alexander Armstrong's Big Ask, a 2011-2013 British panel show
 The Big Ask (film), a 2013 American comedy film